Bodo B. Schlegelmilch is Chair of the Association of MBAs (AMBA) and Business Graduate Association (BGA) as well as Professor and Chair of the Institute for International Marketing at WU, Vienna University of Economics and Business, Vienna, Austria. He has been awarded Fellowships from the Academy of International Business, the Academy of Marketing Science and the Chartered Institute of Marketing and has received the 2020 Significant Contributions to Global Marketing Award of the American Marketing Association.

Biography 

Schlegelmilch obtained his bachelor's degree at the University of Applied Sciences in Cologne, his master's degree, Ph.D. and D.Litt. from the University of Manchester and an honorary Ph.D. from Thammasat University in Bangkok. He served 11 years as Founding Dean of the WU Executive Academy at the Vienna University of Economics and Business, where he founded a number of MBA programs. As Academic Director, he led the Vienna Executive MBA program into the Global Top-50 ranking of the Financial Times.

Starting at Deutsche Bank and Procter & Gamble, he continued his career at the University of Edinburgh and the University of California, Berkeley. Appointments as British Rail Chair of Marketing at the University of Wales and Professor of International Business at Thunderbird School of Global Management followed.

Publications 
Schlegelmilch has been listed among the world's most prolific authors in international marketing. He has published more than a dozen books on different marketing and management topics, including widely noted textbooks in English, German and Mandarin:

Schlegelmilch, Bodo B., Global Marketing Strategy: An Executive Digest (Second Edition). 2022. Cham: Springer, . The various editions of this book are held in 364 libraries, according to WorldCat.
Schlegelmilch, Bodo B and Winer R.S. (eds.), The Routledge Companion to Strategic Marketing, Routledge. 2021. .     
Schlegelmilch, B.B. and WU, H., Global Marketing Strategy: A Digest for Chinese Managers, Sun Yat-sen University Press, 2021. 
Keegan W.J., Schlegelmilch B.B. and Stöttinger B., Globales Marketing-Management. Eine europäische Perspektive, Oldenbourg Verlag, 2002. .

His research spans international marketing strategy, corporate social responsibility and cultural differences and has been published in a variety of academic journals (e.g. Strategic Management Journal, Journal of International Business Studies and Journal of the Academy of Marketing Science).

Other 
Schlegelmilch put forward the "degrees for rent" concept, which calls for abolishing the current university practice of awarding degrees for life to students. Instead, Schlegelmilch maintains that degrees should be awarded only for a fixed period, after which graduates would need to continuously top up with additional courses to maintain the validity of their degree (a key tenet of lifelong education). ("Why MBAs should keep going back to school", Financial Times, January 3, 2019) Schlegelmilch also called for radical innovations of business Schools.

References 

Living people
Academic staff of the Vienna University of Economics and Business
Business educators
Technical University of Cologne alumni
Alumni of the University of Manchester
Academics of the University of Edinburgh
University of California, Berkeley faculty
Procter & Gamble people
Deutsche Bank people
Year of birth missing (living people)
Marketing people
Marketing theorists